Nathan Joseph Fielder (born May 12, 1983) is a Canadian comedian, actor, writer, director, producer, and entrepreneur. He is best known for co-creating, directing, and starring in the Comedy Central parody reality show Nathan for You (2013–2017) and the HBO docu-comedy The Rehearsal (2022–present), and executive producing How To with John Wilson (2020–present).

Early life 
Nathan Joseph Fielder was born into a Jewish family in Vancouver on May 12, 1983, the son of social workers Deb and Eric Fielder. He attended Point Grey Secondary School, where he was a member of the school's improv comedy group, which also included comedian Seth Rogen. He worked as a magician during his teenage years and is a member of The Magic Castle. He studied business at the University of Victoria, where he graduated with a BComm in 2005. After university, he moved to Toronto and enrolled in Humber College's Comedy Program in 2006. He worked briefly for a brokerage firm before quitting to start his comedy career.

Career 
After receiving the Tim Sims Encouragement Fund Award in 2006, Fielder worked as a writer on Canadian Idol, where he was noticed by Michael Donovan, an executive producer for the CBC comedy series This Hour Has 22 Minutes. Donovan hired Fielder as a field correspondent, and developed his popular recurring segment, "Nathan on Your Side". In 2010, Fielder wrote and directed a number of sketches for Season 2 of Important Things with Demetri Martin on Comedy Central. He was also featured as a guest voice actor on the Season 2 finale of Bob's Burgers, "Beefsquatch", as well as the Season 6 episode, "The Land Ship". Fielder played the role of Jon Benjamin's boom operator in the 2011 television series Jon Benjamin Has a Van, and played Bob Woodward in the "Washington, DC" episode of Comedy Central's Drunk History. Fielder has also guest-starred on the Adult Swim show Rick and Morty. He appeared in the 2015 film The Night Before and the 2017 biopic The Disaster Artist. Fielder also has a YouTube channel, mainly comprising short sketches involving him and his friends.

In 2013, Fielder co-created his own show on Comedy Central called Nathan for You. The show, which he wrote, directed, and starred in, was based on the "Nathan On Your Side" segments that he did for This Hour Has 22 Minutes. The show's premise features Fielder, playing a persona loosely based on himself, providing advice for local small businesses. In November 2017, the show finished its fourth and final season.

On the morning of February 7, 2014, a coffee shop called Dumb Starbucks Coffee opened in the Los Feliz neighborhood of Los Angeles. The shop stated that they were operating as a parody of the global coffee company and coffeehouse chain Starbucks and utilized the chain's siren logo in their signage, cups, and other materials. The shop mocked items standard to most Starbucks' locations such as Norah Jones CDs and drinks by using the term "Dumb" in front of the names, such as "Dumb Norah Jones Duets" and "Dumb Iced Vanilla Latte". Beverages and pastries were distributed free of charge. A few days later, Starbucks announced that they were not affiliated with the shop and that they were "evaluating [their] next steps" due to the shop deliberately attempting to mimic the look of a legitimate Starbucks location.

The identity of the person behind the shop was not released initially, and various artists and comedians such as Banksy and Tim & Eric were theorized to be involved with the prank (the latter’s production company Abso Lutely Productions had applied for a filming permit at the Dumb Starbucks Coffee location). On February 10, 2014, the shop was closed by the Los Angeles County Health Department for not having the permits required to operate a coffee shop. Shortly thereafter, Fielder announced that he was behind the parody and the Los Angeles Times noted the prank's similarity to other skits performed on Fielder's show Nathan for You.

Fielder started a not-for-profit company called Summit Ice Apparel in 2015, after learning that the Vancouver-based company Taiga posted a tribute to Holocaust denier Doug Collins. He decided to start his own company and produce soft shell jackets. This endeavor was shown during Season 3 of Nathan for You. 100% of Summit Ice Apparel's profits go to the Vancouver Holocaust Education Centre in Vancouver. The company had close to $500,000 in sales in the first three months. In March 2017, he opened up a pop-up shop in Vancouver where members of the public could buy Summit Ice Apparel or exchange their Taiga jacket for a Summit Ice jacket. Fielder himself worked the register. A film crew was also on-site.

In 2019, it was announced that Fielder had signed an overall deal with HBO, under which he would serve as executive producer for the documentary series How To with John Wilson and star, write, and direct in a separate comedy series. In 2020, Showtime picked up the comedy series [[The Curse (American TV series)|The Curse]], created and written by Fielder and filmmaker Benny Safdie, and starring Fielder, Safdie, and Emma Stone. In 2021, HBO announced the name of another new comedy series, The Rehearsal, starring Fielder, who also served as  writer, executive producer, and director. The Rehearsal was released in 2022 to critical acclaim. 

Personal life
Fielder was married to a children's librarian from 2011 until their divorce in 2014. He is incorrectly listed as female on his U.S. green card. He lives in Silver Lake, Los Angeles.

Fielder describes himself as Jewish but "not particularly religious." Both Nathan for You and The Rehearsal'' contain themes related to modern Judaism such as antisemitism, Holocaust denial, and interfaith parenting.

Filmography

Film

Television

References

External links 

 
 
 
 
 

1983 births
Living people
21st-century Canadian comedians
21st-century Canadian male actors
21st-century Canadian screenwriters
Canadian people of Jewish descent
Canadian male comedians
Canadian male screenwriters
Canadian male television actors
Canadian sketch comedians
Canadian stand-up comedians
Canadian television personalities
Comedians from Vancouver
Jewish Canadian comedians
Jewish Canadian male actors
Jewish Canadian writers
Male actors from Vancouver
This Hour Has 22 Minutes
Humber College alumni
University of Victoria alumni
Writers from Vancouver
Canadian Comedy Award winners